The Unexpected is the 44th book in the Animorphs series, written by K.A. Applegate. It is known to have been ghostwritten by Lisa Harkrader. It is narrated by Cassie.

Plot summary

Following the discovery of a fragment of a Bug Fighter, the U.S. government is attempting to use it for research. Once the Yeerks become aware of this occurrence, they attempt to seize the fragment before it is sent to a NASA research facility. The Animorphs confront the Yeerks in an airport before the Yeerks are able to acquire the fragment. During the fight Cassie is rendered unconscious on a luggage conveyor belt. When she wakes up, she is in the cargo bay of a plane flying to Sydney, Australia. The plane is attacked twice by Yeerks looking for the "Andalite bandit." The Yeerks hold the plane in stasis using a tractor beam. After she is unable to evade them while on the plane, she jumps out and morphs into an osprey. She lands in red sand and hides as a flea until the Yeerks retire their search. She demorphs and meets Yami, who lives in a nearby outstation. He takes her to his family. Yami's grandfather had cut himself on another metal fragment from a Bug Fighter Cassie had earlier destroyed while attempting to escape the Yeerks from the plane. She morphs a Hork-Bajir she acquired during the same plane incident and amputates his infected leg. The Blade Ship appears immediately afterwards and Visser Three demands that she come outside. She complies and attempts to lead the Yeerks away from Yami's family using a kangaroo morph. Two small tourist airplanes fly overhead and Visser Three destroys all evidence that the Yeerks had been in that location to evade suspicion. A Chee who was aboard the Blade ship aids Cassie by projecting a hologram around her as she demorphs, and she returns home.

Morphs

Animorphs books
2003 American novels
2003 science fiction novels
Novels set in Australia